Tagaru is a 2018 Indian Kannada-language action thriller film directed by Duniya Soori and produced by K. P. Srikanth. It features Shiva Rajkumar, Bhavana and Manvitha in the lead roles along with Dhananjay, Vasishta N. Simha and Devaraj in key supporting roles. The soundtrack and score are composed by Charan Raj and the cinematography is by Mahendra Simha Shivakumara Swami of the Sree Siddaganga Mutt appears for three seconds in the film while lyricist Jayanth Kaikini and composer Charan Raj make a guest appearance in a song sequence.

The film was officially launched on 22 August 2016 and the first look was released the following day. The project marks the second collaboration between Soori and Shiva Rajkumar after Kaddipudi (2013).

Tagaru was theatrically released on 23 February 2018 where the film received positive reviews for its narrative style, action sequences, technical aspects, direction and cast performances (particularly Shiva Rajkumar, Dhananjay and Vashista N. Simha). The film became commercially successful at the box office and turned out as the 3rd highest-grossing Kannada film of 2018. The movie completed 100 days theatrical run in 15 centers. A magnanimous chunk of the narrative device from this movie was reported to be the main source of inspiration for the template of the tweaked screenplay of the 2021 Telugu film Krack.

Plot
The narrative describes about the dark side of the crime syndicate where there is a nexus between politicians, police officers, businessmen and gangsters. Daali is a ruthless gangster who along with his best friend Chittaranjan "Chitte", blackmail a minister by using his son's MMS who was indulging with women at a casino. The minister seeks Daali's boss Narayana Swami aka Uncle's help to retrieve the MMS, but Daali and Chitti objects, earning Uncle's wrath. Meanwhile, Chitte, Daali's gang members and Uncle are being murdered by a unknown person named Shiva. Shiva kidnaps a girl named Punarvasu, who begins to fall for him.

It is revealed that Shiva was an Assistant Commissioner of the Karnataka Police Force and was nicknamed as Tagaru Shiva by the police department. Shiva investigated a suicide case of a girl named Tejaswani. The suicide was linked to Daali and his brother Cockroach, where he also investigated a teenager's death, which is orchested by Uncle's aide Baby Krishna. After killing Baby at his hideout, Shiva arrested Cockroach (who came to celebrate Baby's birthday at the hideout) and tortured him in police custody, but released him due to Daali and Uncle's influence. 

Shiva meets Punarvasu's sister Panchami through an alliance sent by Ramachandra, where they began to spend time with each other and decide to get married. A cat and mouse game ensues where Shiva killed Cockroach in a police encounter. Enraged, Daali and Chitte attacked Panchami and Shiva while they were at morning jog. They were admitted to hospital, Though Shiva survived, Panchami died from her injuries. Seeking vengeance for Panchami's death, Shiva had planned everything and killed every associates connected to Daali and Chitte, including Chitte and Uncle. Shiva had rescued Punarvasu as she was arrested by the Goa Police in a raid. 

After the revelation, Shiva escapes from the accident along with Punarvasu, which is orchested by Daali and his gang after finding out that Shiva is behind the murders. They reside with Shiva's senior ACP Ramachandra. Daali tracks down Shiva and hires an hitman to finish him, however in turn of events, Ramachandra gets killed. Shiva kills the hitman and heads to Daali's birthday bash where a final showdown ensues between Shiva and Daali as the two are powerful against each other. Shiva kills Daali, thus avenging Panchami's death and heads to investigate another case.

Cast
 Shiva Rajkumar as ACP Shivakumar 
 Bhavana as Panchami, Shiva's fiancée 
 Manvitha as Punarvasu, Panchami's younger sister
 Dhananjay as Daali aka Nimbe
 Devaraj as ACP Ramachandra, Shiva's mentor
 Vasishta N. Simha as Chittaranjan "Chitte"
 Sudhi as Cockroach, Daali's brother
 Sachidananda Sachu as Don Uncle aka Narayanaswamy
 Devanatha as Baby Krishna
 Poornachandra Mysuru as Jaamoon Ravi
 Anitha Bhat as Daali's girlfriend  
 Triveni Rao as Constable Saroja
 Rockline Sudhakar as Subbi aka Saahiti
 Dileep as Dileepa
 Satyanarayana as Constable Satyanna
 M. N. Lakshmi Devi as Shiva's grandmother

Production

Filming
On 3 November 2015 an article was published with an announcement that after the success of the crime drama film Kaddipudi in 2013, director Soori would again collaborate with actor Shiva Rajkumar for an action film titled Tagaru. However, it was reported that the film would go on floors only after both of them complete their pending projects. On 22 August 2016, the film was officially launched in Bangalore with all the lead cast being finalized. The first schedule was wrapped up on 26 November 2016. The second schedule began on 12 December and was held in Mysore, Udupi, Gokarna and other coastal areas. From 3 March 2017, the third schedule was filmed with actress Bhavana joining the team.

The first schedule was held in and around Bangalore and Tumkur while the second schedule scenes were canned at Mysore, Mangalore and other coastal belt regions of Karnataka.

Casting
After finalizing Shiva Rajkumar to play the lead role, producer K. P. Srikanth, a former associate of Kanakapura Srinivas, took up the project to finance. This film marks his second independent film after Shiva which was directed by Om Prakash Rao. Actress Manvitha Harish was selected to play the female lead, marking her second association with Soori after the successful Kendasampige (2015). Later actors Dhananjay and Vasishta N. Simha were signed for antagonist roles. Dhananjay's hairstyle was modified to suit the role. During the third schedule of the shooting, actress Bhavana was signed to play another pivotal character. Veteran actor Devaraj was signed in to play the key supporting character.

Soundtrack

Charan Raj has been signed to compose the score and songs for the film. The lyrics for the songs are written by V. Nagendra Prasad, Yogaraj Bhat and Jayanth Kaikini.

Release 
It was reported that for the first time ever, multiplexes across the state of Karnataka are seeing standees of an actor draped in garlands of flowers and money. Outside Karnataka, the film released in Mumbai, Thane, Pune, Sangli, Dudhani, Miraj, Chennai, Coimbatore, Delhi, Hyderabad, Kolkata, Ahmedabad, Chandigarh, Goa and Kasargod. Tagaru was reported to have emerged as the biggest ever Kannada film in the opening weekend outside Karnataka by grossing  in 3 days. The movie was also reported to be the first Kannada movie to be released in both Kenya and Japan

Reception

Critical Reception

Tagaru received positive reviews from critics and audience.

New Indian Express rated the movie 4 out of 5 and said "Tagaru manages to fall into the classics category, with intense characters, brilliant screenplay, creative cinematography and promising music including the background score playing with the stunts scenes. This is a simple and familiar story, but it is told remarkably well with Suri’s new style that is non-linear". Rating 3 out of 5, Bangalore Mirror praised it by saying"If the presentation is all that matters, Tagaru will remain entrenched at the top for a long time to come. When a dazzling screenplay is given a higher pedestal than an engaging plot what you get is Tagaru in all its resplendent glory." but cautioned "It is mayhem. The timeline is impossible to follow post-interval without disengaging yourself from the proceedings. The overweening complexity takes the fun out of the narration. The film tried to look like a Quentin Tarantino film, but ends up like a Ram Gopal Varma film." Deccan Herald called it  "A glorious celebration of machismo and underworld gangsta warfare, Tagaru splashes the screen with gut-wrenching gore and bloodshed. This idiom of cinematic narration, ensures novelty and niftyness, certain surefootedness providing Tagaru with the zip and style to be engrossed in it.", rating it 3 out of 5. Deccan Chronicle, rating it 2.5 out of 5 warned "More confusions even as several characters keep getting introduced every now and then, making it hard, harder and hardest to stay on with it right till the end. Suri falters at delivering what is most essential in a tale of this nature - a gripping thriller". The Hindu said "This happens to be one of Shivanna’s most mature performances. Suri pays homage to one of his favorite directors Ram Gopal Varma's Satya in the initial portions. There’s the internecine struggle for supremacy, cops and the khadi-clad using goons to eliminate opponents and for extortion. However, Suri's strong visual sense is just not matched by writing skills. It's as if scattered scenes have been picked up and pieced together on the editing table. A convoluted narrative does not make a film different". Indiaglitz commented that "Soori has applied the earlier Upendra tactics in his narration style and never misses the link. For that audience have to make a long jump in this flashback technique of narration. The terrific narration is very strong in contents although it confuses here and there. Shivarajakumar as an intelligent and cool-headed cop has given a profound performance."

While compiling the 25 Greatest Kannada Films of the Decade , Karthik Keramalu of Film Companion had said "The entire film has uber-cool written all over it, albeit with guns and billhooks. Tagaru is the star -film of the decade (yes it's above K.G.F on the charts)".

Accolades

Possible sequel
Suri had revealed that there would be a sequel to this movie even before the movie released while shooting the end credits of this film at the Bandi Makalamma temple. Producer Sreekanth also gave the go-ahead for the sequel, and the team even had the muhurath done with a simple puja.

Remake

The copyrights of the Tamil remake version were sold to Tamil director M Muthaiah who has signed to remake the movie with either Vikram Prabhu. Tamil remake is titled as Raid.

References

External links 

2018 films
2010s Kannada-language films
2018 action films
Indian action films
Films shot in Bangalore
Films shot in Mysore
Films scored by Charan Raj
Indian nonlinear narrative films
Films directed by Duniya Soori